Musicae Sacrae (On Sacred Music) is a 1955 encyclical by Pope Pius XII dealing with Catholic liturgical music. It updated the 1903 motu proprio Tra le sollecitudini, and remained in force as part of canon law until superseded by Musicam sacram in 1967.

The encyclical continued in the tradition of Tra le sollecitudini of keeping a rather conservative attitude toward music used in worship.

However, the encyclical did soften some of the previous restrictions. It allowed the singing of vernacular hymns at certain places in the mass, formalizing existing practice in places such as Germany.

References

Further reading

External links 
 Official English translation

Catholic music
Encyclicals of Pope Pius XII
1955 in Christianity
1955 documents